The East Coast Rowing Council is the regional organisation of Skiff rowing on Ireland's East coast, representing the sport of Coastal and ocean rowing. As per local tradition, coastal rowing is undertaken by crews of four with one sweep oar each, and a coxswain, in wooden clinker-built boats. Formed in 1936, the ECRC has the task of formalising the rules, organising regatta dates and judging any disputes between members. Rules were laid down as to sizes and weights of skiffs to make races fairer. The ECRC represents clubs in the counties of Dublin, Wicklow, and North Wexford.

East Coast tradition 

Clinker skiff-type boats were once one of the most numerous type of working boats found along the eastern seaboard of Ireland. They were recorded in 1874 by historian E.W. Holdsworth, where he noted that ‘The smaller boats employed for the line-fishery are of the same style as the Norway yawl, sharp at both ends.’.

Skiff racing has its origins in the occupation of hobbling. Hobblers were freelance pilots, and competition was strong to be the first to board the approaching ships. Not only did the successful hobblers receive payment to pilot the ships into port but they were also awarded the contract for discharging/loading those ships whilst in port.

The skiffs worked mainly between Lambay Island just north of Dublin Bay and Wicklow Head, where they required considerable skill on behalf of the oarsmen. The long tradition of rowing is now carried on through the rowing clubs affiliated to East Coast Rowing Council. These clubs can be found around the old Dublin pilot stations of Ringsend and East Wall in Dublin Port, Dun Laoghaire, Dalkey, Bray, Greystones, Wicklow, Arklow, and Courtown.

Member clubs 
The current members of the ECRC are:
Fingal Rowing Club, Balbriggan, Co Dublin
Skerries Rowing Club
 St. Patrick's Rowing Club, Ringsend
Stella Maris Rowing Club, Ringsend
St. Michael’s Rowing Club, Dún Laoghaire
Dalkey Rowing Club
Bray Rowing Club
Greystones Rowing Club
Wicklow Rowing Club
Arklow Rowing Club
Courtown Rowing Club

Racing 
Each year the ECRC organises a summer schedule of regattas at clubs from Ringsend to Arklow where crews of all ages compete during the regatta. ECRC clubs also regularly compete in the biennial ‘Celtic Challenge’, a race of over 90 miles from Arklow to Aberystwyth in Wales as well as other long distance races such as the annual Ocean to City race in Cork, or the Kish lighthouse row in Dublin. Clubs can be regularly seen training at sea along the East Coast between April and September each year.

2017 events and regattas 
The ECRC schedule for 2017 is as follows:-

2016 events and regattas 
The ECRC schedule for 2016 was as follows:-

2015 events and regattas 
The ECRC schedule for 2015 was as follows:-

2014 events and regattas 
The ECRC schedule for 2014 was as follows:-

2013 events and regattas 
The schedule for 2013 (ECRC regattas and significant other regattas) was as follows:-

2012 events and regattas 
The schedule for 2012 (ECRC and non-ECRC events) was as follows:-

2011 events and regattas 
The schedule for 2011 was as follows:-

2010 events and regattas 
2010 was an exciting year in the ECRC calendar with the ‘Celtic Challenge’ kicking off the season for a few of the clubs. Below are the dates of most of the events ECRC crews made an appearance at:

2009 regattas

References 

Rowing in Ireland